The Place Pinel is a square and street in the 13th arrondissement of Paris.

History
The square is named for the psychiatrist Philippe Pinel (1745 – 1826), "benefactor of strangers", because of its proximity to the Hôpital de la Salpêtrière where he worked.

In 2012, the square was completely redeveloped by the Direction de la Voirie et des Déplacements de la Mairie de Paris, the City of Paris transport section. At this time, the central circle was recovered in granite paving. Its design represents a pine cone, represented with logarithmic spirals based on Fibonacci numbers. These spirals emphasise the proportions of the square's rotunda.

See also 
 Squares in Paris

References 

Pinel
Squares in Paris
1867 establishments in France